Post-cognitivist psychology comprises varieties of psychology that have emerged since the 1990s, challenging the basic assumptions of cognitivism and information processing models of cognition, and forms one of the fields contributing to the postcognitivism movement. Important predecessors of these movements include critical psychology and humanistic psychology.

Further reading 
 Wallace, B.; Ross, A.; Davies, J.; Anderson, T. (2007). The Mind, the Body and the World: Psychology After Cognitivism? Exeter: Imprint Academic.

See also 
Situated cognition 
Distributed cognition 
Embodied cognition 
Dynamicism 
Discursive psychology

Psychological schools
Psychological theories